Argiris Giannikis (born 9 July 1980) is a Greek professional football manager.

Career

PAS Giannina
In 2019, Giannikis was appointed as the coach of PAS Giannina. In his first season with the club, he managed to win the 2019–20 title and so the club was promoted to Super League 1, the top division of Greek football. In 2020–21, he led the team to an 9th place finish. He also managed to get the team into the semi-finals of the 2020–21 after beating Atromitos and Panathinaikos. PAS Giannina reached the semi-finals for the third time in its history. In the semifinals, the club lost to Olympiacos 2–4 on aggregate.

Managerial

Honours

PAS Giannina 
Super League 2: 2019–20

References

External links
 Profile on Official website of PAS Giannina
 

Living people
German people of Greek descent
German football managers
Rot-Weiss Essen managers
VfR Aalen managers
PAS Giannina F.C. managers
3. Liga managers
1980 births
Sportspeople from Nuremberg
German expatriate sportspeople in Greece
German expatriate football managers
Expatriate football managers in Greece